Franklin County Seminary is a historic school building located at Brookville, Franklin County, Indiana.  It was built in 1831, and is a two-story, five bay, Federal style brick building.  It has a side gable roof and interior end chimneys.  The county seminary closed in 1851.

It was listed on the National Register of Historic Places in 1974.  It is located in the Brookville Historic District.

References

School buildings on the National Register of Historic Places in Indiana
Federal architecture in Indiana
School buildings completed in 1831
Buildings and structures in Franklin County, Indiana
National Register of Historic Places in Franklin County, Indiana
Historic district contributing properties in Indiana